Acox is a surname. People with this surname include:
Clarence Acox Jr., American band director and jazz drummer
Kristófer Acox (born 1993), Icelandic basketball player

See also
ACOX1, human gene which encodes the enzyme peroxisomal acyl-coenzyme A oxidase 1
ACOX3, human gene which encodes the enzyme peroxisomal acyl-coenzyme A oxidase 3